St Dympna's GAA may refer to:

St Brendan's GAA (Dublin), a sports club formerly known as St Dympna's
Dromore St Dympna's GFC, a sports club